Mercedes Soler may refer to:

 Mercedes Soler (actress), Mexican actress
 Mercedes Soler (journalist), American journalist